Innermost Station is Cause & Effect's third release, contains nine introspective tracks including the single "World Is Ours" . Soon after the recording of Innermost Station was completed, drummer Richard Shepherd amicably left the band to pursue personal interests. Released in 1997 under the Liquefaction label. The Album was re-released in 1999.

Track listing
"Eclipse" – 5:01
"Generation" – 3:19
"World Is Ours" – 5:04
"Mars" – 4:10
"She's So Gone" – 4:47
"Radiolaria" – 2:31
"Real?" – 4:46
"Leaded" – 3:28
"Overdose" – 9:51

Personnel
Percussion, Drums [Drumset], Programmed By – Richard Shepherd (2) 
Synthesizer, Vocals, Programmed By – Keith Milo 
Vocals, Guitar, Programmed By – Robert Rowe*
Written By, Producer, Recorded By, Mixed By – Cause & Effect
Mastered By – Doug Doyle 
Mastered By [Premastering] – Rick Campbell, Shane Dillard

Cause and Effect (band) albums
1997 albums